Art Pictures Studio is a Russian film-making company that operates both in the domestic and international market. Founded in 1992 by Fedor Bondarchuk and Dmitry Rudovsky, the studio is part of the Art Pictures Group.

Until 2005 the company specialized primarily in the filming of commercials and music videos, and then filmmaking was chosen as the key goal of the studio’s activities.

Filmography

References

External links 
 Art-Pictures Studio

Russian film studios
Film production companies of Russia
Companies based in Moscow
Russian brands